The  2G 7280 "lipstick" phone is a mobile telephone model supplied by Nokia. It supports GSM, SMS, MMS, HSCSD, GPRS, and SyncML. It has a VGA camera.  Its design features a slider end and a Navi-Spinner in the place of a keypad. As part of Nokia's "Fashion Phone" line, it has black, white and red styling, and a screen that fades to a mirror when inactive.  Fortune Magazine listed it as one of the best products of 2004  while its design was praised by the jury in the iF product design awards for 2005. The battery could only be replaced by an authorised service center.

Adverts for the Nokia Fashion Collection were directed by photographer David LaChapelle. There are a total of 3 versions of the commercial, each featuring one of the 3 phones including the Nokia 7280. The others are Nokia 7260 and 7270.

The phone is shown in the Pussycat Dolls' "Beep" music video. It was also featured in the music video for "Say I" by Christina Milian. and in the music video for "Get Right" by Jennifer López.

It was succeeded by the Nokia 7380 which was released in 2006.

References 

7280
Mobile phones introduced in 2004
Mobile phones with infrared transmitter
Slider phones
Mobile phones with user-replaceable battery